Mindoro is an island in the Philippines.

Mindoro may also refer to:

 Mindoro (province), a Philippines province of 1921–1950 on the island
 Battle of Mindoro, a World War II battle between Japan and the United States on the island
 Mindoro Airport, in the Philippines (but not on the island)
  (1945–1961), a ship of the U.S. Navy
 Mindoro, Wisconsin, United States, an unincorporated community

Species

 Mindoro black rat 
 Mindoro bleeding-heart, a bird
 Mindoro bulbul, a songbird
 Mindoro climbing rat 
 Mindoro crocodile 
 Mindoro hawk-owl 
 Mindoro imperial pigeon 
 Mindoro narrow-disked gecko 
 Mindoro racket-tail, a parrot 
 Mindoro scops owl 
 Mindoro shrew 
 Mindoro stripe-faced fruit bat 
 Mindoro striped rat 
 Mindoro tree frog
 Mindoro warty pig